Tarun Sai Nethula (born 8 May 1983) is an Indian-born cricketer who has played for the New Zealand national cricket team. He started his cricket training at St. Johns Cricket Academy in Hyderabad, Telangana and moved to New Zealand at the age of 11.

He made his international debut for New Zealand in 2012 in a One Day International against Zimbabwe. He completed all ten overs, but did not take a wicket.

Domestic career 
He was the leading wicket-taker in the 2017–18 Ford Trophy, with 21 dismissals in ten matches for Auckland as Auckland took the title from Nethula's former team, the Central Stags. Jeet Raval commented: "It's a big game, big players step up and Tarun has been a big player for the Aces for the last four to five years and long may it continue". Nethula took 43 Plunket Shield wickets in 2016–17, one behind Stags left-arm spinner Ajaz Patel, his former teammate.

Besides playing cricket has a career as Sports Director at Mount Roskill Grammar School, since May 2017. He graduated from Massey University with a degree in International Business.

References

1983 births
Living people
New Zealand cricketers
Auckland cricketers
Central Districts cricketers
Northern Districts cricketers
New Zealand One Day International cricketers
People from Kurnool
Indian emigrants to New Zealand
People educated at Mount Roskill Grammar School
Naturalised citizens of New Zealand